A Strange Thing to Say (also released as A Strange Thing 2 Say) is the third EP by Sopor Aeternus & the Ensemble of Shadows and is the first part of the trilogy A Triptychon of GHOSTS (or: El Sexorcismo de Anna-Varney Cantodea), which includes album Have You Seen This Ghost? and EP Children of the Corn. This is the first Sopor release since 2003's Es reiten die Toten so Schnell to not be produced by John A. Rivers. Instead, Patrick Damiani of the band Rome has co-produced the record.

The EP comes in 4 different versions: a CD packaged in a  format with a DVD containing the music video for "A Strange Thing to Say"; a special fan package; a 12-inch vinyl edition (with bonus track); and a standard CD release. The  edition comes with a 96-page booklet, a brooch, a magnet and a set of nine postcards; while the vinyl comes with an A4 12-page booklet. Each pressing of the limited editions are signed and numbered by Anna-Varney Cantodea herself.

Track listing
CD pressing

Vinyl pressing

Personnel
 Patrick Damiani: Co-producer
 Thomas Haug: violin
 Tim Ströble: cello
 Wayne Coer: trumpet
 Fenton Bragg: trombone
 Eugene de la Fontaine: tuba
 Uta Ferson: clarinet
 Benjamin Dover: oboe
 Eric Chen: bassoon
 Burt Eerie: drums
 Terrence Bat: drums
 Anna-Varney Cantodea: All vocals and other instruments

References

2010 EPs
Sopor Aeternus and The Ensemble of Shadows albums